Microgastrinae is a subfamily of braconid wasps, encompassing almost 3,000 described species, with an estimated 30,000–50,000 total species. This makes it one of the richest subfamilies with the most species of parasitoid wasps.

Genera
These 84 genera belong to the subfamily Microgastrinae:

 Agupta Fernandez-Triana, 2018
 Alloplitis Nixon, 1965
 Alphomelon Mason, 1981
 Apanteles Förster, 1862
 Austinicotesia Fernandez-Triana, 2018
 Austrocotesia Austin & Dangerfield, 1992
 Beyarslania Koçak & Kemal, 2009
 Billmasonius Fernandez-Triana, 2018
 Buluka de Saeger, 1948
 Carlmuesebeckius Fernandez-Triana, 2018
 Chaoa Luo & You, 2004
 Choeras Mason, 1981
 Clarkinella Mason, 1981
 Cotesia Cameron, 1891
 Cuneogaster Choi & Whitfield, 2006
 Dasylagon Muesebeck, 1958
 Deuterixys Mason, 1981
 Diolcogaster Ashmead, 1900
 Distatrix Mason, 1981
 Dodogaster Rousse, 2013
 Dolichogenidea Viereck, 1911
 Eripnopelta Chen, 2017
 Exix Mason, 1981
 Exoryza Mason, 1981
 Exulonyx Mason, 1981
 Fornicia Brullé, 1846
 Gilbertnixonius Fernandez-Triana, 2018
 Glyptapanteles Asmead, 1904
 Hygroplitis Thomson, 1895
 Hypomicrogaster Ashmead, 1898
 Iconella Mason, 1981
 Illidops Mason, 1981
 Janhalacaste Fernandez-Triana, 2018
 Jenopappius Fernandez-Triana, 2018 
 Jimwhitfieldius Fernandez-Triana, 2018
 Keylimepie Fernández-Triana, 2016
 Kiwigaster Fernández-Triana, Whitfield & Ward, 2011
 Kotenkosius Fernandez-Triana, 2018
 Larissimus Nixon, 1965
 Lathrapanteles Williams, 1985
 Mariapanteles Whitfield & Fernández-Triana, 2012
 Markshawius Fernandez-Triana, 2018
 Microgaster Latreille, 1804
 Microplitis Förster, 1862
 Miropotes Nixon, 1965
 Napamus Papp, 1993
 Neoclarkinella Rema & Narendran, 1996
 Nyereria Mason, 1981
 Ohenri Fernandez-Triana, 2018
 Papanteles Mason, 1981
 Parapanteles Ashmead, 1900
 Parenion Nixon, 1965
 Paroplitis Mason, 1981
 Pelicope Mason, 1981
 Philoplitis Nixon, 1965
 Pholetesor Mason, 1981
 Prasmodon Nixon, 1965
 Promicrogaster Brues & Richardson, 1913
 Protapanteles Ashmead, 1898
 Protomicroplitis Ashmead, 1898
 Pseudapanteles Ashmead, 1898
 Pseudofornicia van Achterberg, 2015
 Pseudovenanides Xiao & You, 2002
 Qrocodiledundee Fernandez-Triana, 2018
 Rasivalva Mason, 1981
 Rhygoplitis Mason, 1981
 Sathon Mason, 1981
 Semionis Nixon, 1965
 Sendaphne Nixon, 1965
 Shireplitis Fernández-Triana & Wardan Achterberg, 2013
 Silvaspinosus Fernandez-Triana, 2018
 Snellenius Westwood 1882
 Tobleronius Fernandez-Triana, 2018
 Ungunicus Fernandez-Triana, 2018
 Venanides Mason, 1981
 Venanus Mason, 1981
 Wilkinsonellus Mason, 1981
 Xanthapanteles Whitfield, 1995
 Xanthomicrogaster Cameron, 1911
 Ypsilonigaster Fernandez-Triana, 2018
 Zachterbergius Fernandez-Triana, 2018
 † Dacnusites Cockerell, 1921
 † Eocardiochiles Brues, 1933
 † Palaeomicrogaster Belokobylskij, 2014

Description and distribution
These wasps are small, with 18 segmented antennae. Most species are black or brown, a few are more colorful. Many species are morphologically similar enough to be considered cryptic species. Species within this subfamily have a worldwide distribution. 135 species of Microgastrinae have been confirmed from Canada, though the number may be as high as 275. At least 28 species have been identified from Turkey in Gökçeada and Bozcaada.

Biology
Microgastrinae are koinobiont, primary endoparasitoids of larval Lepidoptera. While most species are solitary, many are gregarious, meaning multiple wasp eggs develop within the same caterpillar. When the eggs hatch the wasp larvae feed on the hemolymph and organs of their host. Once fully developed, the larvae exit the dying caterpillar and immediately spin silken cocoons where they pupate.

Microgastrinae is one of six subfamilies of Braconidae which carry polydnaviruses.

More than 100 species of Microgastrinae have been used in biological control programs.

Coevolution with polydnaviruses 
Microgastrinae need the virus to be able to reproduce. How it is exactly done is by injecting eggs with the proviral genome plus virions into the host's cavity. The virions then infect and discharge their DNA into the host's cells, stopping it from killing the wasp's offspring and instead promoting its growth inside the host's body.

External links 

Photographs at BugGuide.net
UniProt Taxonomy Consortium
DNA barcodes at BOLDSystems

References 

 
Apocrita subfamilies